Sumy is a city in the eponymous raion and oblast in Ukraine.

Sumy may also refer to:

Places
 Sumy Raion, Sumy Oblast, Ukraine
 Sumy Oblast, Ukraine
 Roman Catholic Deanery of Sumy, Sumy Oblast, Ukraine

Facilities and structures
 Sumy Airport, Sumy, Ukraine
 Sumy railway station, Sumy, Ukraine
 Sumy State University, Sumy, Ukraine

People
 Sumy (footballer) (born 1991), Malian soccer player
 Sumy Sadurni (1989–2022), Spanish-Mexican photojournalist and photographer

Other uses
 Battle of Sumy (2022), during the Russian invasion of Ukraine
 , an anti-submarine corvette first of the Soviet, then Ukrainian Navy
 PFC Sumy, Sumy, Ukraine; a soccer team
 FC Sumy, Sumy, Ukraine; a soccer team

See also

 Sumy National Agrarian University, Sumy, Ukraine
 
 Sume (disambiguation)
 Sumie (disambiguation)
 Sumi (disambiguation)